Petrophile seminuda is a species of flowering plant in the family Proteaceae and is endemic to southwestern Western Australia. It is a shrub with needle-shaped, sharply-pointed leaves usually divided into two or three lobes, and heads of yellow flowers.

Description

Taxonomy
Petrophile seminuda was first formally described in 1840 by John Lindley in A Sketch of the Vegetation of the Swan River Colony. The specific epithet (seminuda) means "half-bare", referring to the bracts.

Distribution and habitat
This petrophile is mostly found in woodland, shrubland and heath on sandplains and ridges, growing in sandy-loamy soils over laterite. It is widely distributed between Geraldton, the Fitzgerald River National Park and the Darling Range to near Southern Cross.

Conservation status
Petrophile seminuda is classified as "not threatened" by the Government of Western Australia Department of Parks and Wildlife.

References

seminuda
Eudicots of Western Australia
Endemic flora of Western Australia
Plants described in 1840
Taxa named by John Lindley